The Church of the Nativity of the Virgin Mary is a Macedonian Orthodox church of the Prespa-Pelagona Diocese in Bitola, North Macedonia. Built in 1870 and consecrated in 1876, the church's icon collection contains icons dating from the 19th century. Among the church's icons is a miraculous (čudotvorna) icon of the Virgin Mary that had been stolen from the church in the 1970s and returned in 2017.

The church is listed as an Object of Cultural Heritage by the Ministry of Culture.

References

Further reading

Buildings and structures in Bitola
Macedonian Orthodox churches